STATS may refer to:
 Statistical Assessment Service 
 STATS LLC, a former name of Stats Perform, most notable for compiling one of the main ranking systems in NCAA Division I FCS football

See also
 Stats